Antonio José Valencia (born 10 May 1925, date of death unknown) was a Bolivian football midfielder who played for Bolivia in the 1950 FIFA World Cup. He also played for Club Bolívar. Valencia is deceased.

References

External links

1925 births
Year of death missing
1950 FIFA World Cup players
Association football midfielders
Bolivian footballers
Bolivia international footballers
Club Bolívar players